The Central Committee of the Komsomol (Russian: Центральный комитет ВЛКСМ, Tsentral'niy komitet VLKSM) was the executive leadership of the All-Union Leninist Young Communist League, commonly known as the Komsomol. According to the Komsomol Charter adopted at the 14th Congress of the Komsomol (1962), the Central Committee "directs the entire work of the Komsomol, local Komsomol bodies, represents the Komsomol in state and public institutions and organizations, approves the editorial board of the central body - "Komsomolskaya Pravda" and other editorial offices, distributes the Komsomol budget and monitors its implementation." The Central Committee of the Komsomol was dissolved on September 28, 1991 along with the Komsomol organization itself.

Organization 
The Central Committee was elected at Komsomol congresses by secret ballot. The Central Committee consisted of full members who could cast a vote and candidate members who had an advisory vote during plenary sessions. The Central Committee of the Komsomol elected the First Secretary of the Central Committee (de facto leader of the Komsomol), the Bureau, and the Sectretariat.

Congresses 
During its 73-year history, the Central Committee of the Komsomol held a total of 22 congresses. Initially, congresses were held every year but after 1922 they were held less frequently.

First Secretaries of the Komsomol

See also 

 Komsomol
 Komsomolskaya Pravda

References 

Komsomol
1918 establishments in Russia
1991 disestablishments in the Soviet Union